The 1891–92 season was the ninth to be played by the team that are now known as Bristol Rovers, and their eighth playing under the name Eastville Rovers.

Season review
This was the last season that the club would spend playing mainly friendly matches, as they would become founder members of the newly-formed Bristol & District Football League (now known as the Western League) in the summer of 1892. The opposition consisted mainly of teams that would also join the league next season, along with Kingswood, Craigmore College, and a Swindon Town "A" team. The club's participation in the Gloucestershire Senior Cup saw them reach the semi-final stage: A first-round victory over Craigmore College was followed by defeat by Warmley, both games ending with a 7–1 scoreline.

After a year's hiatus the reserve team returned to action, entering the Gloucestershire Junior Cup. After receiving a first-round bye, they beat St Paul's 4–0 before suffering a heavy 8–1 defeat to St George Reserves in the third round.

Results

First team

Gloucestershire Senior Cup

Club matches

Reserves

Gloucestershire Junior Cup

Club matches

Statistics
Friendly matches are not included in this section.

Cumulative record
The total cumulative record of Eastville Rovers up to the end of the 1891–92 season is shown below. This is calculated by adding the numbers in the section above to the total games played up to the end of the last season. Friendly matches are not included in this table, and games held at neutral venues are considered to have been played away from home.

As of the summer of 1891, Rovers' competitive matches had all been played in the Gloucestershire Cup.

References

Bibliography

Bristol Rovers F.C. seasons
Eastville Rovers